Hazratbal is the notified area situated in Srinagar district of Jammu and Kashmir. The early settlements in the area occurred on the banks of Dal Lake and majority of population of area are Hangis (fishermen). The area became famous after the construction of Hazratbal Shrine where hundreds of thousands of people visit every year because many relics related to the Islamic prophet Muhammad are believed to be there. 

The word Hazrat in Urdu gives indication of respect and bal in Kasmiri means place. Thus the word Hazratbal means the place which is highly respected among the people. Due to the presence of Dal Lake and its house boats in vicinity, the area became the famous tourist spot in the city. The economy of the people living here greatly depends on tourism. Also the grave of Sheikh Muhammad Abdullah is situated in the area. The postal code of the area is 190006.

Divisions
The areas which come under the constituency of Hazratbal are as under:
 Hazratbal town
 Naseem Bagh
 Batpora
 Zukura
 Ishber
 Nishat
 Shalimar
 Sadiribal
 Gulab Bagh
 Molvi Stop 
 Bota kadal 
 Lal Bazar Hazratbal Main Road
 Pari Chowk Lal Bazar Hazratbal Main Road
 Tailbal 
 Lal Bazar etc.

Education
There are three institutions in the area.
 Kashmir University
College of Engineering - University of Kashmir also known as "Zukura Campus"
 National Institute of Technology, Srinagar
Due to this reason it is considered as higher education centre in Kashmir Valley. Students from different parts of the state study Art, Humanities, Science, Arabic, Persian, Urdu, Engineering in these institutions.

See also
 90 Feet Road
 Buchpora
 Nowhatta

References

 Neighbourhoods in Srinagar
Cities and towns in Srinagar district
Islam in Kashmir
Jammu and Kashmir
Kashmir
Srinagar